Dyscophus guineti, the false tomato frog or the Sambava tomato frog, is a species of frog in the family Microhylidae. It is endemic to Madagascar. Its natural habitats are subtropical or tropical moist lowland forest, subtropical or tropical swamps, swamps, freshwater marshes, intermittent freshwater marshes, and heavily degraded former forest. It is threatened by habitat loss.

Description, The Dyscophus guineti male frogs are yellowish, and in size 60-65mm. The female frogs are red- orange often with many small reticulations, in size 90-95mm. Some of these frogs have an Odontoma which are tumors from a tooth that also contain tissue. These cause bad tooth eruption and displacement of erupted teeth. Another aspect which concerns these frogs is the way they capture their prey using their tongues and mouth.  It is based on how close their prey is to them, the way they capture it changes.  If their prey is smaller and at an azimuthal location of less than 40A degrees, they will aim their heads at the prey and not their tongues.  If their prey is larger and at an azimuthal location greater than 40A then they proceed to aim both their head and tongue at their prey.  The process when the prey is larger is better known as hydrostatic elongation.  The dysciphus guinteti also has tongue movements sperate of the lower jaw which changes their speed, momentum, and projection of their tongue in different situations.

References

Sources
 AmeyZoo: Frogs that are commonly kept as pets
 Giulia Tessa, Fabio M. Guarino, Jasmin E. Randrianirina & Franco Andreone (2011) Age structure in the false tomato frog Dyscophus guineti from eastern Madagascar compared to the closely related D. antongilii (Anura, Microhylidae), African Journal of Herpetology, 60:1, 84–88, DOI: 10.1080/21564574.2011.561881.

Dyscophus
Endemic frogs of Madagascar
Amphibians described in 1875
Taxa named by Alfred Grandidier
Taxonomy articles created by Polbot